Sten "Stepa" Suvio (born Schuschin, 25 November 1911 – 19 October 1988) was a Finnish boxer who won the welterweight contest at the 1936 Summer Olympics. He then turned professional and by 1949 accumulated a record of 34 wins (15 knockouts), 9 losses and 3 draws.

Suvio started as a football player, wrestler and speed skater before changing to boxing in 1927. He placed second at the national championships in 1929 and 1930, and then won four consecutive amateur titles in 1933–36. Suvio fought in the Continuation War and was wounded in a hand in 1941. After recovering he captured the Finnish professional welterweight title in 1946. He retired in 1949 and then coached the Swedish (1949–57) and Turkish (1957–60) national boxing teams. He was inducted into the Finnish Boxing Hall of Fame in 2005.

1936 Olympic results
Below is the record of Sten Suvio, a Finnish welterweight boxer who competed at the 1936 Berlin Olympics:

 Round of 32: defeated Keikan Ri (Japan) on points
 Round of 16: defeated Leonard Cook (Australia) on points
 Quarterfinal: defeated Imre Mandi (Hungary) on points
 Semifinal: defeated Gerhard Pedersen (Denmark) on points
 Final: defeated Michael Murach (Germany) on points (won gold medal)

References

1911 births
1988 deaths
People from Vyborg District
People from Viipuri Province (Grand Duchy of Finland)
Welterweight boxers
Olympic boxers of Finland
Boxers at the 1936 Summer Olympics
Olympic gold medalists for Finland
Olympic medalists in boxing
Medalists at the 1936 Summer Olympics
Finnish male boxers
Finnish military personnel of World War II